The Curtiss A-2 was a small 2 cylinder V-type engine built by the Curtiss Aeroplane and Motor Company around 1909. It was developed from an earlier Curtiss motorcycle engine.

Specifications (A-2)

External links
 

A-2
1900s aircraft piston engines